Cantharidella picturata, common name the painted kelp shell, is a species of sea snail, a marine gastropod mollusk in the family Trochidae, the top snails.

Description
The size of the shell varies between 4 mm and 8 mm.
The small, narrowly umbilicate shell has a conical shape. It is excessively variable in coloration, the following patterns are most usual:

(1) whitish with longitudinal broad or narrow red or crimson flames reaching to the periphery, the ground-color and base dotted with red. The flames are frequently interrupted in the middle by a dotted zone.

(2) the ground-color is clear yellowish or whitish, the lirae dotted with red. This pattern frequently shows short flames of red under the sutures.

(3) the entire surface is purplish black, the umbilicus green-tinged.

Except the last variety, all are whitish around the umbilicus. In all, the inside of the umbilicus and the columella are tinged with green.

The spire is elevated, conical, rather obtuse. The sutures are impressed. The five to six whorls are convex. They are encircled by lirae, usually 5 or 6 in number on the penultimate whorl, but very variable. The body whorl shows a prominent rib at the periphery, convex beneath. The  aperture is quadrangular, delicately ribbed within and iridescent, green predominating. The columella is arcuate above, then straight and oblique, terminating near the base in a slight denticle.

This is a beautiful little species, usually either flamed with dark red or dotted all over with pink. The ground-color sometimes has a green cast, or is pink.

Distribution
This marine species is endemic to Australia and occurs off Queensland, New South Wales, Victoria and Tasmania.

References

Further reading
 Adams, A. & Angas, G.F. 1864. Descriptions of new species of shells, chiefly from Australia in the collection of Mr Angas. Proceedings of the Zoological Society of London 1864: 35-40 
 Fischer, P. 1878. Genres Calcar, Trochus, Xenophora, Tectarius et Risella. pp. 241–336 in Keiner, L.C. (ed.). Spécies general et iconographie des coquilles vivantes. Paris : J.B. Baillière Vol. 11.
 Tate, R. & May, W.L. 1901. A revised census of the marine Mollusca of Tasmania. Proceedings of the Linnean Society of New South Wales 26(3): 344-471
 Hedley, C. 1916. Studies on Australian Mollusca. Part 13. Proceedings of the Linnean Society of New South Wales 41: 680-719
 Hedley, C. 1918. A checklist of the marine fauna of New South Wales. Part 1. Journal and Proceedings of the Royal Society of New South Wales 51: M1-M120
 May, W.L. 1921. A Checklist of the Mollusca of Tasmania. Hobart, Tasmania : Government Printer 114 pp.
 May, W.L. 1923. An Illustrated Index of Tasmanian Shells. Hobart : Government Printer 100 pp.
 Allan, J.K. 1950. Australian Shells: with related animals living in the sea, in freshwater and on the land. Melbourne : Georgian House xix, 470 pp., 45 pls, 112 text figs.
 Macpherson, J.H. & Gabriel, C.J. 1962. Marine Molluscs of Victoria. Melbourne : Melbourne University Press & National Museum of Victoria 475 pp
 Hickman, C.S. & McLean, J.H. 1990. Systematic revision and suprageneric classification of trochacean gastropods. Natural History Museum of Los Angeles County. Science Series 35: i-vi, 1-169
 Wilson, B. 1993. Australian Marine Shells. Prosobranch Gastropods. Kallaroo, Western Australia : Odyssey Publishing Vol. 1 408 pp.

External links
 To World Register of Marine Species
 

picturata
Gastropods of Australia
Gastropods described in 1864